Asztalos is a Hungarian-language occupational surname  literally meaning "carpenter". Notable people with this surname include:

Csaba Ferenc Asztalos  
Dávid Asztalos
Lajos Asztalos

Hungarian-language surnames
Occupational surnames